Senator Colton may refer to:

Don B. Colton (1876–1952), Utah State Senate
Eben Pomeroy Colton (1829–1895), Vermont State Senate